Richard Karikari (born July 23, 1979, in Accra, Ghana) is a professional Canadian football safety who last played for the Calgary Stampeders. He was drafted by the Montreal Alouettes in the second  round of the 2003 CFL Draft. He played CIS football for the St. Francis Xavier X-Men.

External links
 Richard Karikari at ProFootballArchives
 Toronto Varsity Blues coach bio

1979 births
Calgary Stampeders players
Canadian football defensive backs
Canadian players of Canadian football
Ghanaian players of Canadian football
Ghanaian sportsmen
Hamilton Tiger-Cats players
Living people
Montreal Alouettes players
St. Francis Xavier X-Men football players
Sportspeople from Accra